Gibbsville is a 1976 American dramatic television series starring John Savage and Gig Young. The plot centers on the activities of two reporters for a newspaper in a small Pennsylvania town in the 1940s. It aired from November 11 to December 30, 1976 on NBC.

Cast

 John Savage as Jim Malloy
 Gig Young as Ray Whitehead
 Biff McGuire as Dr. Mike Malloy
 Peggy McCay as Mrs. Malloy
 Bert Remsen as Mr. Pell

Synopsis

In the 1940s, Jim Malloy returns to his hometown, the fictional small mining town of Gibbsville, Pennsylvania, after being expelled from Yale University during his sophomore year. He becomes a young cub reporter for the towns newspaper, the Gibbsville Courier. He works there with a senior reporter, Ray Whitehead, who had begun his career in journalism with the Courier and left Gibbsville to pursue a promising career with more prestigious newspapers in larger cities. However, alcoholism had made Rays career falter, and he had returned to Gibbsville and the Courier to try to make a fresh start. Mr. Pell is the editor of the Courier and is Jims and Rays boss.

Jim lives in Gibbsville with his parents, Dr. Mike Malloy and Mrs. Malloy. Dr. Malloy is the towns physician.

Production

David Gerber was Gibbsvilles executive producer. The stories and characters in the show were based on the writings of John O'Hara about the fictional Gibbsville (itself based closely on the real-life town of Pottsville, Pennsylvania), and the opening credits refer to the show  as "John OHaras Gibbsville."

In addition to a 1975 television movie written and directed by playwright Frank D. Gilroy that served as the shows pilot, thirteen episodes were produced, although only six of them aired.

Broadcast history

A 90-minute television movie, John OHaras Gibbsville – later retitled The Turning Point of Jim Malloy and alternatively titled Gibbsville: The Turning Point of Jim Malloy – aired on NBC on April 12, 1975. Based on the John O'Hara semi-autobiographical story anthology The Doctors Son, it served as the pilot for Gibbsville. Several delays followed in getting the weekly series on the air. Gibbsville finally was to have premiered at the beginning of NBCs fall 1976 season, but it encountered one last delay when it was displaced at the last minute. After the cancellation of the series Gemini Man, NBC reshuffled its Thursday evening lineup and added Gibbsville to the schedule in mid-November 1976.

Gibbsville finally premiered as a weekly series on November 11, 1976 – 17 months after its pilot aired – and NBC broadcast it at 10:00 p.m. on Thursdays throughout its brief run. Its sixth episode was broadcast on December 30, 1976, after which NBC cancelled it. The remaining seven episodes never aired.

Episodes
Sources:

References

External links

Opening credits for Gibbsville on YouTube
Opening of "The Turning Point of Jim Malloy" (1975 pilot for Gibbsville) on YouTube

NBC original programming
1976 American television series debuts
1976 American television series endings
1970s American drama television series
English-language television shows
Television shows set in Pennsylvania
Television series by Sony Pictures Television